Masoba (spelt Mhasoba in Maharashtra) is one of the folk guardian deities, a form of Lord Shiva, worshipped in some parts of India. His temples are found mainly in States of Maharashtra and Andhra Pradesh. Masoba is considered to be God of Spirit and temples are generally found near Smashan (cemeteries) or outside the village.

Many communities like Lajjhars, Joshis, Pradhans, Mangs, Chamars and Dhangars worship Masoba and at times offer sacrifice of he-goats. They believe that Masoba is their guardian deity and protects them from evil spirits. However, it is the Dalit community, which mainly worship Masoba.  There are many places, where annually a religious rally (Yatra) called Masoba Yatra is held, when the deity is carried in Palkhi (palanquin).

References

Regional Hindu gods
Hindu folk deities